Portrait of a Beauty is a 2008 South Korean film directed by Jeon Yun-su. Adapted from the bestselling novel Painter of the Wind by Lee Jung-myung, the film portrays Joseon-era painter Sin Yun-bok (better known by his pen name, Hyewon) as being a woman disguised as a man.

Portrait of a Beauty opened in South Korean theaters on 13 November 2008. It was the 8th most attended domestic film of 2008 with 2,364,482 tickets sold.

Plot
Retired court painter Sin Han-pyeong seeks to settle an old score with the most sought-after painter of that time, Kim Hong-do (Kim Young-ho). Sin raises his son to surpass Kim Hong-do, but his son commits suicide over his lack of talent. The father then pushes his daughter Yun-jeong to disguise herself as her brother and enter the world of court painters.

The grown-up Yun-jeong (Kim Gyu-ri), now known under the pen name "Hyewon," finally enters the court and learns to paint under the guidance of Kim Hong-do, who is trusted by King Jeongjo.

Kim Hong-do quickly notices Yun-bok's huge potential as well as his girlish features. Things remain normal until Yun-bok goes out and comes across a playful seller of mirrors, Kang-mu (Kim Nam-gil). When their romantic adventure takes off, it is Kim Hong-do who ends up heartbroken. Kim's jealousy, and his desire to own Yun-bok physically and emotionally, soars to a perilous level.

Cast 
 Kim Gyu-ri as Sin Yun-bok
 Kim Young-ho as Kim Hong-do
 Kim Nam-gil as Kang-mu
 Choo Ja-hyun as Seol-hwa
 Han Myeong-goo as King Jeongjo
 Park Ji-il as Sin Han-pyeong
 Kwon Byeong-gil as Kim Geo-sang
 Choi Kyoo-hwan as Artist Choi
 Yeo Ho-min as Artist Shim
 Kim Seung-hoon as Artist Hong
 Kang San as young Yun-bok

Artistic license
Sin Yun-bok, better known by the pen name Hyewon, was a real historical figure who produced a host of thematically provocative and artistically excellent paintings in the 18th century. However, not one record of the painter still exists.

Several art history scholars have criticized the Korean entertainment industry for distorting historical facts about the painter, who was unquestionably a man. The novel had also been adapted into the television series Painter of the Wind.

Awards and nominations
2009 Baeksang Arts Awards
 Nomination – Best Actress – Kim Gyu-ri

2009 Chunsa Film Art Awards
 Best Cinematography – Park Hee-ju
 Best Editing – Park Gok-ji
 Best Art Direction – Lee Ha-jun

2009 Grand Bell Awards
 Best Cinematography – Park Hee-ju
 Nomination – Best Director – Jeon Yun-su
 Nomination – Best Actress – Kim Gyu-ri
 Nomination – Best Supporting Actress – Choo Ja-hyun
 Nomination – Best Lighting – Kim Seung-gyu
 Nomination – Best Art Direction – Lee Ha-jun
 Nomination – Best Costume Design – Lee Yu-suk

2009 Blue Dragon Film Awards 
 Nomination – Best Supporting Actress – Choo Ja-hyun
 Nomination – Best Lighting – Kim Seung-gyu
 Nomination – Best Art Direction – Lee Ha-jun

References

External links 
  
 
 
 

2008 films
2000s historical romance films
South Korean historical romance films
South Korean biographical films
Biographical films about painters
Films set in the 18th century
Films set in the Joseon dynasty
Films based on South Korean novels
2000s Korean-language films
2000s biographical films
2000s South Korean films
CJ Entertainment films
Sponge Entertainment films